Day of Atonement may refer to:

Religion
In Judaism:
Yom Kippur, the Jewish Day of Atonement
Yom Kippur Katan ("Minor Day of Atonement")
In Islam:
Day of Atonement (Nation of Islam), a national day established in 1995 by the Nation of Islam
In Christianity:
Investigative Judgment, the antitypical Day of Atonement according to the Seventh-day Adventist Church
Christian observances of Yom Kippur

Cultural
Day of Atonement (film)
Day of Atonement (play), a play by Samson Raphaelson, which became the 1927 film The Jazz Singer

Biblical phrases